The Palazzo Pola e Todescan is a building in central Florence, Italy. The palazzo was completed in 1903. It is in the Art Nouveau style and was designed by architect Giuseppe Paciarelli.

The building was initially built as residence for Counts of Pola. It housed the Florence branch of Pola & Todescan, a store selling clothing made in Britain. As of 2015, it is occupied by a bank.

References

Pola and Todescan
Art Nouveau architecture in Italy